Hands in the Air may refer to:

"Hands in the Air", song by Joe Satriani, Is There Love in Space?
"Hands in the Air", song by Music Instructor from The World of Music Instructor
"Hands in the Air", song by 8-Ball from 2 Fast 2 Furious
"Hands in the Air", song by Miley Cyrus from Bangerz
"Hands in the Air", song by Timbaland & Ne-Yo from Step Up Revolution soundtrack
"Hands in the Air", song by Da Brat from Unrestricted
"Hands in the Air", song by AZ from Aziatic